Mohamed Charmi (born May 28, 1981) is a Paralympian athlete from Tunisia competing mainly in category T37 middle-distance events.

Mohamed has competed in three Paralympic Games and has picked up 6 medals. His first Games were in 2004 in Athens.  He won a gold medal in the T37 1500m and a silver in the T37 800m as well as a second gold as part of the Tunisian T35-38 4 × 400 m.  Four years later in Beijing he failed to medal in either the T37 200m or 800m but did win a bronze as part of the Tunisian 4 × 100 m relay team in the T35-38 class race.

Athletics
Men's 1500m - T37

Men's 800m - T37

External links

 

Paralympic athletes of Tunisia
Athletes (track and field) at the 2004 Summer Paralympics
Athletes (track and field) at the 2008 Summer Paralympics
Paralympic gold medalists for Tunisia
Paralympic silver medalists for Tunisia
Paralympic bronze medalists for Tunisia
Living people
1981 births
Athletes (track and field) at the 2012 Summer Paralympics
Medalists at the 2004 Summer Paralympics
Medalists at the 2008 Summer Paralympics
Medalists at the 2012 Summer Paralympics
Tunisian male middle-distance runners
African Games gold medalists for Tunisia
African Games medalists in athletics (track and field)
African Games silver medalists for Tunisia
African Games bronze medalists for Tunisia
Athletes (track and field) at the 2011 All-Africa Games
Paralympic medalists in athletics (track and field)
21st-century Tunisian people
20th-century Tunisian people